William Jacob McGill  (1880–1959) was an American right-handed pitcher in Major League Baseball. He played for the 1907 St. Louis Browns. His college ball was played at Friends University.

External links

1880 births
1959 deaths
Friends Falcons baseball players
Major League Baseball pitchers
Baseball players from Kansas
St. Louis Browns players
Minneapolis Minnies players
Austin Senators players
Leavenworth Convicts players
Enid Railroaders players
Guthrie Senators players
People from McPherson County, Kansas